Çitlibahçe is a village in the Hazro District of Diyarbakır Province in Turkey.

References

Villages in Hazro District